The 2002 Supercupa României was the 6th edition of Romania's season opener cup competition. The match was played in Bucharest at Stadionul Național on 10 August 2002, and was contested between Divizia A title holders Dinamo București and Cupa României champions Rapid București. Rapid won the trophy.

Match

Details

References

External links
Romania - List of Super Cup Finals, RSSSF.com

Super
2002
2002
2002